Pablo Nicolás Royón Silvera (born January 28, 1991) is a Uruguayan footballer.

References
 Profile at BDFA 
 

1991 births
Living people
Uruguayan footballers
People from Las Piedras, Uruguay
Association football forwards
Liverpool F.C. (Montevideo) players
Centro Atlético Fénix players
Sud América players
Atlético de Rafaela footballers
Olimpo footballers
Deportes Iquique footballers
Club Atlético Patronato footballers
Nacional Potosí players
Racing Club de Montevideo players
Comunicaciones F.C. players
Cusco FC footballers
Ayacucho FC footballers
Uruguayan Primera División players
Chilean Primera División players
Argentine Primera División players
Bolivian Primera División players
Liga Nacional de Fútbol de Guatemala players
Peruvian Primera División players
Uruguayan expatriate footballers
Expatriate footballers in Chile
Expatriate footballers in Argentina
Expatriate footballers in Bolivia
Expatriate footballers in Guatemala
Expatriate footballers in Peru
Uruguayan expatriate sportspeople in Chile
Uruguayan expatriate sportspeople in Argentina
Uruguayan expatriate sportspeople in Bolivia
Uruguayan expatriate sportspeople in Guatemala
Uruguayan expatriate sportspeople in Peru